Nettleton Stadium is a baseball stadium in Chico, California on the campus of California State University, Chico. It is the home field for the CSU Chico Baseball team, the Wildcats. It also served as the former home of the now-defunct Chico Heat and Chico Outlaws professional baseball teams and Chico Heat collegiate wood bat league team. It holds 4,100 people. The stadium was named for majority owner of the Chico Heat, Steve Nettleton and his wife Kathy Nettleton. The Nettleton family donated the 4.5 million dollar facility to CSU.

"Another attendance record was set a few days later in California as the July 4th game in Chico between the Outlaws and their rival Reno Silver Sox was sold out before the contest. Standing room only tickets quickly sold out at the ballpark bringing a Nettleton Stadium record of 4,699 fans to the game. The demand was so great that over 3,000 additional fans that couldn't get into the event flooded neighboring fields and parking lots to cheer the team through the fences and enjoy the post-game fireworks show."

See also
 Arcata Ball Park
 Harry & David Field
 Kiger Stadium
 Miles Field demolished in 2005
 Tiger Field
 Appeal-Democrat Park
 Travis Credit Union Park demolished 2008

References

External links
 Chico State University Athletics home page
 Chico Heat official website
 3D Nettleton Stadium model

1997 establishments in California
Baseball venues in California
Buildings and structures in Chico, California
California State University, Chico
Chico State Wildcats baseball
College baseball venues in the United States
Minor league baseball venues
Sports in Chico, California
Sports venues completed in 1997